The Lords of Corswarem are the heads of the  noble house of Corswarem-Looz. The current Duke, Thierry is the 11th Duke of Corswarem-Looz.

List

Lords of Corswarem 
Originally the Lords of Corswarem belong to a branch of the Lords and counts of Los. the first mentioned in the Supplement aux Trophees is Robert of Los, lord of Corswarem, married to Ida; Lady of Geneffe. He acted a foundation in  1247 in a foundation for Herckenrode Abbey. He participated to the Seventh Crusade of Louis IX of France with his three sons, and arrived in 1249 in Damiate.

Robert of Looz, Lord of Corswarem x Ida of Geneffe.
Arnoult I of Los, Lord of Corswarem x Eleonore; Lady of Niel.
Arnoult II of Los, Lord of Corswarem x Aleydis of Warfuzee.
Arnoult III of Los, Lord of Corswarem. x Marie de Chabot.
Arnoult IV of Los, Lord of Corswarem x Catherine Alix de Warfuzee.
Arnoult V of Los, Lord of Corswarem x Joanne Alix, Lady of Argenteau.
Arnoult VI of Los, Lord of Corswarem, died 1399 x Elisaneth of Berlo
Thierry de Loos-Coswarem, lord of Neuville x Catherine de Hemtinne.Wauthier de Loos-Coswarem x Marie-Fraçoise de MérodeJean de Loos-Coswarem x Isabeau de Ligne.Jacques de Looz-Corswarem: See furtherGuillaume de Looz-CorswaremGuikllaume II de Looz-Corswarem x Aleydis Lady of Aerschot, RiviereEngelbert de Looz-Corswaremx Catherine, lady of Argenteau.Arnoult VII of Looz, Lord of Corswarem
Catherine of Los-Corswarem x Renault, Lord of Argenteau.Gérard, Lord of Argenteau x Philipotte of Houfalize.

 Counts of Looz-Corswarem and Holy Empire Catherine of Looz-Corswarem x Jacques de Looz-Corswarem, son of Jean I de Corswarem x Isabeau de Ligne.François I, Count de Looz-Corswarem, (1551-1593) x Antoinette de Gulpen.Jean, Count de Looz-Corswarem, died 1657Erasme, Count de Looz-Corswarem x Marie de Binckem.Hubert, Count de Looz-Corswarem: became in 1652 1st Baron of Longchamp.Jean-Hubert,  Count de Looz-Corswarem: see further.François II, Count de Looz-Corswarem, married Marie Hamilton.Joseph, Count de Looz-Corswarem x Madeleine Thérèse, Countess de Looz-CorswaremJoseph-Clément, Count de Looz-Corswarem: See Further.Jacques II died 1621 x Agnes de Byelandt
Philipotte, married Philippe, Lord of Berlaymont.

 Dukes of Corswarem-Looz 
The ducal line is not had the possibility to continue straight from father to son, after the death of the 3rd Duke, another line had to be recognised by the crown. The descendants of François II continued the line of dukes. In the 17th century the dukes had large connection in the Holy Roman Empire, and no difficulties to find a bride of good house.Jean Hubert, Count of Corswarem-Looz, 2nd Baron of Longchamps: married Marguerite-Claire de Ligny-ArgenteauNicolas-François, de Corswarem-Looz, 3rd Baron of Longchamps x Marie-Françoise de Trazignies: no heirs.Antoine-Hubert, Count of Corswarem-Looz: died without heirs.
 Louis-Félix, 1st Duke of Corswarem Looz:Married 1st/ Hélène-Thérese de Spanghen d'Uyternesse,2nd/ Marie-Françoise d'assignies.Charles-Louis-August-Ferdinand-Emmanuel, 3rd Duke of Corswarem-Looz and Prince of Rheina-Wolbecq (1769-1822): Imperial Lord Chamberlain.x Princess of Prussia: No heirs.
Charles-Alexandre-Auguste, Count of Corswarem-Looz: Lord Chamberlain of the Archduchess.
Jean-Florent-Lamoral-Louis-Charles-François, Count of Corswarem-LoozJean-Jacques, Count of Corswarem-Looz:married to Marie-Florence Coloma, countess of Bornhem. daughter of Pedro II Coloma, 3rd Baron of Bornhem.Emmanuel-Marie, Count of Corswarem-Looz, married to Marie-Thérèse de Bassignies.Joseph-Philippe, 2nd Duke of Corswarem-Looz x Marie-Elisabeth de Beer : No heirs.Joseph-Clément, Count de Looz-Corswarem x Jeanne-Marie d'AnglureGuillaume-Joseph, 4th Duke of Corswarem-Looz x Marie-Emmanuelle, Baroness of Aix
Clementine-Josephine de Corswarem-Looz; married to Florent Stanislas-Amour de Lannoy-Clairvaux
Napoleon de Lannoy-Clairvaux, Prince de Rheina-Wolbecq.Charles-Louis-Auguste, 5th Duke of Corswarem-Looz x Marie-Caroline de Nue.Charles-Napoleon, 6th Duke of Corswarem-Looz''' x Hermine de Lonckhorst.

See also
 House of Looz-Corswarem for other members of the current family

References

Cor
Lists of Belgian nobility
Dukes of Belgium